Set The Alarm For Monday  is a studio album by New York City jazz drummer Bobby Previte & The New Bump. Composition and arrangement is credited to Previte. "The New Bump" refers to a prior Bobby Previte ensemble "Bump the Renaissance" of 1998. The New Bump includes Ellery Eskelin on tenor saxophone, Steve Bernstein on trumpet, Bill Ware on vibraphone, Brad Jones on bass, Jim Pugliese on percussion and Previte on drums.

The tracks are composed as a suite. Also, the provocative song titles and suspenseful recordings "suggest an evocative film-noir atmosphere".

Track listing 
 "Set The Alarm For Monday" 4:28 
 "I'd Advise You Not To Miss Your Train" 5:39
 "She Has Information" 4:32
 "Were You Followed?" 3:43
 "I'm On To Her" 4:28
 "There Was Something In My Drink" 6:06
 "You're In Over Your Head" 5:44
 "Drive South, Along The Canyon" 5:08
 "Wake Up Andrea, We're Pulling In" 8:46"

References 

2008 albums
Bobby Previte albums